Saysetha (or Xaysetha District) is a district (muang) of Attapu province in southern Laos.

Settlements
Xaysetha

References

Districts of Attapeu province